WZKQ-LP (105.3 FM) was a low-power radio station licensed to Hodges, South Carolina, United States. The station was owned by Hodges Women in Broadcasting Club.

On October 6, 2015, the Federal Communications Commission (FCC) notified the station's owners that it would consider WZKQ-LP's license to have expired on June 20, 2015 due to having been silent for more than twelve months, unless they were shown otherwise. The notice was returned as undeliverable, and the FCC deleted the WZKQ-LP call sign on November 12, 2015.

References

External links
 

ZKQ-LP
ZKQ-LP
Greenwood County, South Carolina
Radio stations established in 2004
2004 establishments in South Carolina
Defunct radio stations in the United States
Radio stations disestablished in 2015
2015 disestablishments in South Carolina
ZKQ-LP